Highgate Wood School is a secondary school located in Crouch End in the North London borough of Haringey. It accommodates pupils aged 11–16, providing secondary education to 1,500 pupils. The school also has a sixth form (ages 16–18). The school has a uniform.

Most pupils come from South Haringey School, Rokesly Primary School, Ashmount School, Campsbourne School, Weston Park Primary School and Coleridge Primary School.

History 
Highgate Wood School was founded as a comprehensive school in 1967. It replaced Bishopswood and Priory Vale secondary modern schools. Bishopswood school opened in 1961 and Priory Vale was formed in 1962 from a merger of North Haringey and Crouch End secondary modern schools.

Until 1987 the school was located on two sites – a lower school for pupils in year 7 and year 8, and an upper school for years 9 to 11 and the sixth form. The lower school was situated in the former Crouch End secondary modern school buildings, at the corner of Wolsley Road and Park Road, with the Home Economics and CDT wing facing onto Park Road. Some of the original buildings still stand today, converted into modern flats above shops.  The upper school (located in the former Bishopswood secondary modern school buildings)- Montenotte Rd, down a small hill- now houses the whole school – including sixth form, computer centre, tennis courts, and sports hall.

Former headteachers of the school are Eurof Walters (1967–1979) James McIntyre Smith (1979–1997), and Pauline Ashbee (1997–2006)

Sixth form 
The sixth form unit was twinned with that of Hornsey School for Girls in 1987, a union that was dissolved in 2009. The Ofsted inspection of Highgate Wood School in 2005 commented on its 'improving' sixth form results, which has continued with results improving further year on year and large numbers of students going on to their chosen university places, including places within the Russell Group and at Oxbridge.

Achievements 
Highgate Wood School's has enjoyed success in the performing arts and the school's music department has a well-deserved reputation, both for the standard of its concert performances and for the large number of students who benefit from individual instrumental tuition. It has established excellent results in mathematics and science, whilst also nurturing talents in English. Together with strong academic achievement Highgate Wood School has a strong sense of community which was commented on by Ofsted in their inspection in November 2021.

Novelist Romesh Gunesekera was writer-in-residence at Highgate Wood School.
Publications arising from his residency include Crumbs on a Page (2009), and Pages Held With Words (2011). The author Keren David also worked with the school as part of the Patron of Reading scheme.

Alumni from Highgate Wood School are invited to join their Alumni site at www.futurefirsthub.org.uk

Notable former pupils 

 Anna Shaffer- English actress, best known for her role as Ruby Button in teen soap opera Hollyoaks, and for her role as Romilda Vane in the Harry Potter film series.
 Tiana Benjamin – actress in the BBC soap opera EastEnders (attended from 1995 to 2000))
 Chipmunk – Musical artist
 Laurie Cunningham (d.1989) – footballer, played for Real Madrid and England
 Sway DaSafo – musical artist / performer / producer (attended from 1994 to 1999
 Scarlett Alice Johnson – actress in the BBC soap opera EastEnders (played role of "Vicky Fowler") (attended from 1997 to 2002)
 Judge Jules – radio DJ / musical recording artist (attended from 1978 to 1983)
 Mikele Leigertwood – professional footballer (Reading FC)
 Jobi McAnuff – professional footballer (Reading FC)
 Gary McKinnon (attended from 1977 to 1982)
Alison Joseph – crime novelist
 Robert Peston – journalist and ITV Political Editor (attended from 1971 to 1978)
 Sonique – musical artist / performer / producer (attended from 1979 to 1984)
 Naomi Kritzer – American science fiction author (attended from 1986 to 1987)
 Mat Zo – British electronic music producer, composer and DJ.
 Ozwald Boateng – Fashion designer
 Ellie Rowsell – Musical Artist - Lead Singer of British Alternative Rock Band Wolf Alice

References

External links
 Official website

Secondary schools in the London Borough of Haringey
Community schools in the London Borough of Haringey
Educational institutions established in 1967
1967 establishments in England